The table below shows all results of Toyota Motorsport GmbH and Toyota Gazoo Racing WRT in World Rally Championship. To date, Toyota had won 76 WRC races.

WRC Results (Group A era)

WRC Results (WRC era) 

* Season still in progress.

References
 results at juwra.com

External links
 

Toyota
World Rally Championship constructor results